Golden Grove may refer to:

Places
 Golden Grove, Antigua and Barbuda, in St. John's parish
 Golden Grove, Carmarthenshire, Wales, a mansion
surrounded by Gelli Aur country park
 Golden Grove, Guyana, a settlement near Nabaclis
 Golden Grove, Jamaica, a village
 Golden Grove, South Australia, a suburb of Adelaide
 Golden Grove, New South Wales, an urban place in Sydney

Other uses
 Golden Grove (ship), three ships
 Golden Grove Mine, a copper, gold, lead, silver, and zinc mine in Western Australia
 Golden Grove, a 1655 devotional work written by Jeremy Taylor while living at Gelli Aur